The 2nd Manchurian Army was a field army of the Russian Empire that was established in 1904 during  the Russo-Japanese War, to operate in Manchuria against Japan. It was one of the three such armies that were created and was disbanded in September 1905 after the end of the War.

History
After the lost Battle of Liaoyang, Tsar Nicholas II of Russia decided to disband the "Manchurian Army" , that encompassed all units of the Russian Imperial Army formations operating in the region against the Imperial Japanese Army under just one commander, and split it up in the 1st, 2nd, and 3rd Manchurian Armies.

The 2nd Manchurian Army was created in September 1904 under command of Lieutenant general Oskar Gripenberg. It counted 120 battalions, 79 squadrons, 439 guns, and a total of 81,799 men. On February 12, 1905, General Alexander von Kaulbars took over command of the army. It participated in the Battle of Shaho, Battle of Sandepu and Battle of Mukden.

After the end of the War, the 2nd Manchurian Army was disbanded in September 1905.

Order of battle
The 2nd Manchurian Army consisted of the following units :
1st Siberian Army Corps
1st Siberian Rifle Division
9th Siberian Rifle Division
Combined Corps
8th Army Corps
14th Infantry Division
15th Infantry Division
10th Army Corps
9th Infantry Division
31st Infantry Division

Commanders
The formation was commanded by :
 09.1904-12.02.1905 : General Oskar Gripenberg
 12.02.1905-09.1905 : General Alexander von Kaulbars.

References

Books

1904 establishments in the Russian Empire
Armies of the Russian Empire
Military units and formations established in 1904
Military units and formations disestablished in 1905